Karunatilaka  is a Sinhalese surname. Notable people with the surname include:

 Harindra Karunatilaka, Sri Lankan researcher
 Shehan Karunatilaka (born 1975), Sri Lankan writer

Sinhalese surnames